Quavers are a deep-fried potato-based British snack food. Launched in the UK in 1968, they were originally made by Smith's. Since 1997 they have been produced by Walkers. The name comes from the musical note, quaver.

History
Quavers were launched in 1968 with the advertising slogan "you get a lovely lot of Quavers in a bag", described as "curly potato puffs". The brand was originally sold in cheese and smoky bacon flavours, but over the years flavours like Spicy Beef, Sweet and Sour, Prawn Cocktail, and Ketchup were also part of the range.

In 1993, a Salt and Vinegar flavour was added to the range, and by this time, the packaging transitioned to the Walkers brand name.

Walkers, owned by PepsiCo, purchased the Quavers brand in July 1995, when it became one of the Frito Lay International brand names.

In 1996, a Tangy Tomato flavour was added to the range. By 1997, the brand was part of Walkers' short-lived "Snackshack" range, and was relaunched twice in April 1998 and in March 1999. In October 1998, the first relaunch coincided with the return of Prawn Cocktail with a new recipe (as such, was branded as "New") replacing Tangy Tomato, while the second relaunch coincided with a newly refreshed Cheese flavour. Another packaging refresh took place in July 2000.

In August 2002, a "Streaky Bacon" flavour was added to the range, which contained pink and brown pieces, that resembled bacon.

In September 2004, Ghost-shaped Cheese Quavers were released for Halloween, and returned in September 2005.

In February 2007, Walkers changed the packaging for Quavers, Wotsits, Squares, French Fries and Monster Munch. This packaging reflected the usage of sunseed oil, which was used in all products. The Multipack bags were in a different layout, being in Landscape style. Quavers' logo was changed slightly, and the flavours remained the same.

In December 2009, Quavers, Wotsits, Squares, and French Fries all changed their packaging again to coincide with a "99 Calories or Less" range with a consumers’ focus on “New Year New Me”.  The Cheese flavour was reduced to 87 Calories for a standard pack.

In February 2011, Quavers packaging updated to a brighter bag colour with the Walkers logo on the packets again. After a while, the brand was sold in simply Cheese flavour.

In July 2013, the six-packs were reduced in size removing 30% of the wrapping but keeping the same amount of bags inside.

In August 2019, the packaging was updated alongside other Walkers Snacks, to inform about a reduction in plastic used on the packet.

In December 2020, Walkers announced that Prawn Cocktail and Salt and Vinegar would return to shelves in January 2021 due to popular demand.

Ingredients 
Quavers are currently available in Cheese, Prawn Cocktail and Salt and Vinegar, but have had many other varieties over the years.

The primary ingredient in Quavers is potato starch. They are deep fried to give a snack with a similar texture to krupuk (prawn crackers), but have a different flavour and are smaller with a curled-up rectangle shape (similar in cross-section to a quaver). The product line went on to introduce two other flavours, prawn cocktail and salt and vinegar. These were discontinued in 2012. Ketchup and sweet and sour flavours were also introduced, but for a limited time only and are no longer available. In January 2021, Quavers returns two long-lost flavours (prawn cocktail and salt & vinegar) by popular demand.

Nutrition
A one pack (16.4 g) serving of regular Quavers contains 88 calories, of which 44 are from fat. Quavers contain a mixture of fats (4.9g): saturated fat 0.4g, polyunsaturated fat 0.6g and monounsaturated fat 3.8g. The sodium content is 170mg. Quavers have 86 calories in their Cheese flavour and 83 in the salt and vinegar variety.

Varieties

Main range
Cheese
Prawn cocktail
Salt and Vinegar
BBQ Sauce
Bacon (discontinued)
Cheese and onion (discontinued)
Chinese Spicy Beef (discontinued)

Limited edition
Ketchup (discontinued)
Sweet and sour (discontinued)

References

External links
 
 Quavers packaging, from 1995 with Walkers logo

The Smith's Snackfood Company brands
Walkers (snack foods) brands